The Energy Market Authority (EMA) is a statutory board under the Ministry of Trade and Industry of the Government of Singapore.

History 
The EMA was set up on 1 April 2001 to take over the regulatory functions of the Public Utilities Board, and the operations of the power grid by SP PowerGrid. The agency's goals are to oversee the further liberalisation and inject competition into the electricity and gas industries in Singapore, ensure a reliable and secure energy supply, and creating a dynamic energy sector in Singapore.

Roles 
EMA performs three key roles: 

 Power Systems Operator: EMA is responsible for the reliable supply of electricity to consumers in Singapore. Its Power System Control Centre acts as the nerve centre to oversee the electricity and gas transmission systems and power generation plants.
 Industry Regulator: EMA regulates the gas and electricity industries in Singapore as well as district cooling services in designated areas.
 Industry Developer: EMA fosters a dynamic energy sector by catalysing research and innovation, facilitating deployment of promising energy solutions, developing a future-ready workforce and engaging both regional and international stakeholders.

Industry Regulation 
As a regulator, EMA issues licenses to companies involved in the generation, retail and transmission of electricity. EMA also oversees the application of electrical worker licences.

Liberalisation of Singapore's Energy Market 
The liberalisation of the energy market started in July 2001 when EMA allowed companies with electricity demand of 2 megawatts (MW) and above to buy electricity from a retailer of their choice. Over the years, the threshold for commercial and industrial consumers who were allowed to switch to their preferred retailer was gradually lowered.

The final phase of liberalisation took place in 2018 when households and small business consumers could also buy electricity from a retailer of their choice. Known as the Open Electricity Market initiative, it started with a soft launch in Jurong in April 2018 before it was extended to the rest of Singapore from November 2018 to May 2019.

As of 30 April 2021, 49 per cent of household accounts and 47 per cent of business accounts have switched to buying electricity from a retailer of their choice.

Energy Research and Innovation 
In 2011, EMA was provided funding under the Research, Innovation and Enterprise (RIE) 2015 plan to motivate innovation in the areas of power utilities, smart grids, and energy storage to address key challenges that were relevant to the industry. Funds were set aside in the RIE 2020 and 2025 plans, where EMA has worked with companies to develop new solutions for the energy sector. EMA had awarded over $100 million in grants in total to over 60 companies, and 20 Institutes of Higher Learning and Research Institutes.

EMA also launched the Singapore Energy Grand Challenge (Industry & Research Community) in 2020 to foster collaboration between the industry and research community in Singapore.

Power Sector Workforce 
In 2012, an industry-led Power Sector Manpower Taskforce was set up to identify and recommend strategies to retain and build a strong Singaporean core in the sector. The taskforce submitted three key recommendations to tackle manpower issues in the power sector: 

 Establish an attraction, retention and development framework
 Launch a sector-wide branding exercise
 Adopt a coordinated approach to drive manpower efforts

Following the review, EMA implemented new initiatives, including the National Energy Competency Framework, the sector's first competency framework in 2015 (now known as the Skills Framework for Energy and Power). 

To attract youth to join the energy sector, EMA introduced structured, experiential learning journeys known as the Powering Lives Trail. EMA also organises Youth@SIEW, held on the sidelines of the annual Singapore International Energy Week. This youth-targeted event includes dialogues with government and industry leaders, career journey sharing sessions by energy-sector professionals and a showcase of energy-related projects by students.

See also 
 Energy in Singapore
 Singapore International Energy Week

References

External links
Energy Market Authority Home Page
Powering Lives Website

2001 establishments in Singapore
Energy in Singapore
Energy regulatory authorities
Government agencies established in 2001
Regulation in Singapore
Statutory boards of the Singapore Government